The church of San Francesco is an ancient church Volterra in the  province of Pisa.

The plain stone church was built in the 13th century for a community of Franciscan friars. The interior has marble monuments to members of the aristocratic family of Counts Guidi, who were patrons of the order. The monument to bishop Guidi (1588) was designed by  Felice Palma. Among the paintings in the altars flanking the nave is a Concession (1585) by  Giovanni Battista Naldini, a Nativity (1591) by Giovanni Balducci, a Crucifixion attributed to Bartolomeo Neroni, and a Crucifixion (1602) painted by Cosimo Daddi. The paintings of the Circumcision of Christ (1490-91) by Luca Signorelli and the stunning masterpiece of the Deposition (1521) by Rosso Fiorentino are no longer here, the church for which they were painted; the former is in the National Gallery of London, while the latter has been moved to the Pinacoteca Civica of Volterrra. The baptismal font was sculpted by Giovanni Battista Bava in 1552.

Chapel of the Daily Cross (Cappella della Croce di Giorno)
This chapel, originally built (1315) by architect Mone Todirigi for a confraternity associated with the church, was decorated in 1410 with frescos by Cenni di Francesco and Jacopo da Firenze with scenes from the Legends of the True Cross. These frescoes were inspired by those of  Agnolo Gaddi  in the Santa Croce of Florence, and the Golden Legend of  Jacobus de Voragine.

 References The information in this article is based on that in its Italian equivalent''.

13th-century Roman Catholic church buildings in Italy
Roman Catholic churches in Volterra
Gothic architecture in Tuscany